Maria Rosa "Ninna" Quario (born 24 May 1961) is a former World Cup alpine ski racer from Italy. Nicknamed "Ninna", she had four World Cup victories and 15 podiums, all in slalom. Quario is the mother of alpine racer Federica Brignone (born 1990).

Biography
Born in Milan, Lombardy, Quario competed in the Winter Olympics in 1980 and 1984, and finished fourth and seventh in the slalom, respectively. She also competed at the 1982 World Championships and placed fifth in the slalom.

World Cup results

Race podiums
4 victories - (4 SL)
15 podiums - (15 SL)

Season standings

World Series
Quario also had two victories in special slaloms in the World Series, which were events held in late November, immediately before the World Cup season.  The first win came at age 17, two months before her initial World Cup victory (and podium).
 28 Nov 1978 - slalom -  Stelvio, Italy 
 26 Nov 1982 - slalom -  Bormio, Italy

References

External links
 
 Sci Club Courmayeur – Maria Rosa Quario  

1961 births
Living people
Alpine skiers from Milan
Italian female alpine skiers
Olympic alpine skiers of Italy
Alpine skiers at the 1980 Winter Olympics
Alpine skiers at the 1984 Winter Olympics